Okanagana is a genus of cicadas in the family Cicadidae. There are at 58 described species in Okanagana.

Species
These 58 species belong to the genus Okanagana:

References

Further reading

External links

 

 
Tibicinini
Cicadidae genera